Shaun Hampson (born 21 March 1988) is a former Australian rules footballer who played 98 games across a 12-year career with the  and Richmond Football Club in the Australian Football League (AFL).

Junior football
Hampson excelled at sport at school, including athletics, swimming and soccer. He did not begin playing Australian football until 2004.  He then joined Mount Gravatt Football Club in 2005, and by the end of the year he was the club's number one ruckman.

AFL career
Hampson was drafted in the priority round of the 2006 AFL Draft by the Carlton Football Club (17th pick overall). He made his debut with Carlton in Round 21, 2007 against North Melbourne.

Hampson struggled with short-sightedness early in his career, and had laser eye surgery prior to the 2012 season to correct it.

Hampson played 63 senior games for Carlton from 2007 until the end of the 2013 season. He was traded to Richmond in October 2013, in exchange for pick 28 in the AFL Draft. Hampson made his senior debut for Richmond in round one of the 2014 season, against the Gold Coast Suns.

Hampson was affected by a back injury in 2017 and did not manage to play a match at AFL level. He also managed just six appearances with the club's reserves side in the VFL.

He played in round 1 of the VFL season in 2018 but did not play another match after that due to a re-occurrence of the same back issues. Hampson announced his immediate retirement from AFL football on 26 June 2018, citing the ongoing effects of his two-year back troubles.

Statistics

|- style="background-color: #EAEAEA"
! scope="row" style="text-align:center" | 2007
|
| 22 || 2 || 1 || 0 || 6 || 5 || 11 || 5 || 0 || 16 || 0.5 || 0.0 || 3.0 || 2.5 || 5.5 || 2.5 || 0.0 || 8.0
|-
! scope="row" style="text-align:center" | 2008
|
| 22 || 10 || 1 || 0 || 26 || 34 || 60 || 20 || 6 || 82 || 0.1 || 0.0 || 2.6 || 3.4 || 6.0 || 2.0 || 0.6 || 8.2
|- style="background-color: #EAEAEA"
! scope="row" style="text-align:center" | 2009
|
| 22 || 15 || 3 || 4 || 35 || 89 || 124 || 34 || 31 || 278 || 0.2 || 0.3 || 2.3 || 5.9 || 8.3 || 2.3 || 2.1 || 18.5
|-
! scope="row" style="text-align:center" | 2010
|
| 22 || 8 || 6 || 8 || 28 || 29 || 57 || 22 || 19 || 104 || 0.8 || 1.0 || 3.5 || 3.6 || 7.1 || 2.8 || 2.4 || 13.0
|- style="background-color: #EAEAEA"
! scope="row" style="text-align:center" | 2011
|
| 22 || 9 || 3 || 5 || 29 || 45 || 74 || 21 || 17 || 185 || 0.3 || 0.6 || 3.2 || 5.0 || 8.2 || 2.3 || 1.9 || 20.6
|-
! scope="row" style="text-align:center" | 2012
|
| 22 || 13 || 15 || 4 || 61 || 59 || 120 || 51 || 24 || 240 || 1.2 || 0.3 || 4.7 || 4.5 || 9.2 || 3.9 || 1.8 || 18.5
|- style="background-color: #EAEAEA"
! scope="row" style="text-align:center" | 2013
|
| 22 || 6 || 3 || 5 || 38 || 25 || 63 || 26 || 12 || 70 || 0.5 || 0.8 || 6.3 || 4.2 || 10.5 || 4.3 || 2.0 || 11.7
|-
! scope="row" style="text-align:center" | 2014
|
| 16 || 11 || 1 || 2 || 26 || 66 || 92 || 20 || 11 || 318 || 0.1 || 0.2 || 2.4 || 6.0 || 8.4 || 1.8 || 1.0 || 28.9
|- style="background-color: #EAEAEA"
! scope="row" style="text-align:center" | 2015
|
| 16 || 4 || 0 || 3 || 18 || 10 || 28 || 13 || 3 || 90 || 0.0 || 0.8 || 4.5 || 2.5 || 7.0 || 3.3 || 0.8 || 22.5
|-
! scope="row" style="text-align:center" | 2016
|
| 16 || 20 || 5 || 4 || 65 || 93 || 158 || 50 || 36 || 652 || 0.3 || 0.2 || 3.3 || 4.7 || 7.9 || 2.5 || 1.8 || 32.6
|- style="background-color: #EAEAEA"
! scope="row" style="text-align:center" | 2017
|
| 16 || 0 || — || — || — || — || — || — || — || — || — || — || — || — || — || — || — || —
|-
! scope="row" style="text-align:center" | 2018
|
| 16 || 0 || — || — || — || — || — || — || — || — || — || — || — || — || — || — || — || —
|- class="sortbottom"
! colspan=3| Career
! 98
! 38
! 35
! 332
! 455
! 787
! 262
! 159
! 2035
! 0.4
! 0.4
! 3.4
! 4.6
! 8.0
! 2.7
! 1.6
! 20.8
|}

Personal life
In January 2011, Hampson began a relationship with Australian model Megan Gale. The pair's first child was born in May 2014. Their daughter Rosie was born in September 2017. Hampson and Gale announced their engagement in July 2017. 

In 2019, Hampson competed in the sixth season of Australian Survivor, also known as Australian Survivor: Champions vs Contenders. He was eliminated on day 32, finishing in 11th place. In 2022, he would return to compete on Australian Survivor: Heroes V Villains.

References

External links

Shaun Hampson' statistics from Footy Wire

1988 births
Living people
Carlton Football Club players
Australian people of English descent
Richmond Football Club players
Mount Gravatt Football Club players
Australian rules footballers from Queensland
Preston Football Club (VFA) players
Australian Survivor contestants
People educated at John Paul College (Brisbane)